Sun Bin (died 316 BC) was a Chinese general, military strategist, and writer who lived during the Warring States period of Chinese history. A supposed descendant of Sun Tzu, Sun was tutored in military strategy by the hermit Guiguzi. He was accused of treason while serving in the Wei state and was sentenced to face-tattooing (criminal branding) and had his kneecaps removed (trad. 臏, sim. 膑, pinyin: bìn), permanently crippling him. Sun escaped from Wei later and rose to prominence in the Qi state, by serving as a military strategist and commander. He led Qi to victory against the Wei state at the Battle of Guiling and Battle of Maling. Sun authored the military treatise Sun Bin's Art of War, which was rediscovered in a 1972 archaeological excavation after being lost for almost 2000 years.

Life

Early life
An alleged descendant of Sun Tzu, Sun Bin was recognized for his brilliance at an early age, while he was still studying military strategy under the tutelage of the hermit Guiguzi. He could recite The Art of War, which made Guiguzi remark that all his other students should look up to Sun Bin as a role model. Pang Juan, a fellow student of Guiguzi, became sworn brothers with Sun. Pang left early and went to serve the Wei state as a military general, making his name after scoring victories in a few battles. Sun Bin, who was still studying with their teacher then, was invited to enter the service of Wei and he became Pang's colleague. However, Pang was secretly jealous of Sun, because he perceived that Sun Bin was more talented, and had learnt more about military strategy from their teacher than he.

Mutilation
Pang Juan framed Sun Bin for treason and reported him to King Hui of Wei, who ordered Sun Bin to be executed. Pang pretended to plead for mercy on Sun's behalf, and the king instead condemned Sun to face-tattooing and removal of the kneecaps, effectively branding Sun as a criminal and crippling him for life. Pang pretended to take pity on Sun and treated him well while trying to trick Sun into compiling his knowledge on military strategy into a book, after which Pang could kill him. Sun eventually realized Pang's true intentions and feigned madness. Pang attempted to test whether Sun had really become insane or not, so he had Sun locked up in a pigsty. Sun appeared to enjoy himself there and even consumed animal faeces, calling them delicious. Pang believed that Sun was truly mad and lowered his guard. Sun later escaped from the Wei state with the help of diplomats from the Qi state.

Service in Qi

In the Qi state, Sun Bin became a retainer (guest) in the residence of Tian Ji, a military general. Once, King Wei of Qi invited Tian Ji to a horse racing competition. Sun Bin suggested a strategy to Tian Ji to utilize his horses to best advantage, and Tian won two out of three rounds in the race. The king was impressed with Tian's victory. Tian admitted that he won with the help of Sun Bin, and recommended Sun's talents to the king. King Wei wanted to appoint Sun Bin as the commander of the Qi armies. Sun declined, as his handicap prevented him from riding horseback, and would have a negative effect on the morale of soldiers. Sun was then appointed chief military advisor instead and served as Tian Ji's deputy.

In 354 BC, Wei state attacked the Zhao state, with Pang Juan leading the Wei army. They besieged the Zhao capital city of Handan. Zhao requested help from Qi, and the king of Qi commissioned Sun Bin and Tian Ji to lead an army to help Zhao. Sun Bin proposed the strategy of "besieging Wei to rescue Zhao" and the Qi army attacked the Wei capital city of Daliang (present-day Kaifeng), forcing the Wei army to turn back to save the city and effectively lifting the siege on Handan. The Wei army was ambushed and defeated by the Qi forces at the Battle of Guiling.

In 342 BC, the Wei army led by Pang Juan invaded the Han state, an ally of the Qi state, and Han requested help from Qi. Sun Bin and Tian Ji were put in charge of the Qi army again to counter the Wei forces. Sun used a strategy of feigning defeat in a series of skirmishes with the Wei forces, in order to lure Pang Juan to pursue him. Sun ordered the Qi troops to reduce the number of cooking stoves they used, creating the false impression that the Qi army was shrinking in size. The pursuing Wei forces led by Pang Juan spotted the trend by observing the marks left behind by the stoves, and Pang fell for Sun Bin's ruse.

Eager to defeat Sun Bin, Pang continued the pursuit and fell into an ambush in a narrow valley laid by the Qi forces. The Wei army suffered a crushing defeat at the Battle of Maling, and the crown prince of Wei was captured by the Qi forces. In traditional folklore, Sun Bin carved the words "Pang Juan dies under this tree" on a tree in the ambush area. When Pang arrived there, he saw that there were carvings on a tree, so he lit a torch for a closer look. Using the torch as the target, the Qi troops lying in ambush attacked. Pang committed suicide after being hit by many enemy arrows.

Sun Bin retired from service because of political entanglement in the court and led a reclusive life as a hermit in the later part of his life.

Works

Sun Bin's Art of War is a military treatise authored by Sun Bin. The book was believed to be lost after the Han dynasty, and although there were numerous references to it in post-contemporary texts, some historians still believed that the book was never written and could be a forgery. However, in April 1972, archaeologists excavated several fragments of scrolls from a tomb in Linyi, Shandong province. Sun Bin's Art of War was found among the scrolls. Although ancient texts mention that the original Sun Bin's Art of War was 89 chapters long, the rediscovered copy had 16 verifiable chapters only. As fragments of Sun Tzu's The Art of War were discovered as well, historians believed that some of the chapters might belong to The Art of War instead.

The newly discovered text provided historians with a different perspective on the Battle of Guiling and Battle of Maling. In addition, when compared to Sun Tzu's The Art of War, Sun Bin's Art of War contained one major difference from the former. The former advised against siege warfare, while the latter suggested tactics for attacking a besieged city. This paralleled a shift in the strategic consideration of siege warfare during the later stages of the Warring States period.

Legacy
Sun Bin sometimes appears as a Menshen (door god) in Chinese and Taoist temples, usually paired with Pang Juan.

His rivalry with Pang Juan is portrayed in the 2011 film The Warring States.

Sun Bin is one of the 32 historical figures who appear as special characters in the video game Romance of the Three Kingdoms XI by Koei.

See also 
 Pang Juan
 Sun Bin's Art of War
 Sun Tzu
 Yinqueshan Han Slips

References 

 The Seven Military Classics of Ancient China. Sawyer, Ralph D. 
 Sun Pin: The Art of Warfare. Lau, D. C. and Ames, Roger T. 

316 BC deaths
Ancient Chinese military writers
Chinese amputees
Chinese gods
Deified Chinese people
Generals from Shandong
Military strategists
Qi (state)
Sun Tzu
Wei (state)
Writers from Shandong
Year of birth unknown
Zhou dynasty generals
Zhou dynasty writers